Giuliano Galiazzo (born 29 April 1946) is an Italian rower. He competed in the men's eight event at the 1972 Summer Olympics.

References

1946 births
Living people
Italian male rowers
Olympic rowers of Italy
Rowers at the 1972 Summer Olympics
Place of birth missing (living people)